The Haus Cumberland (simply translated as Cumberland House) is a Grade II listed building on the Kurfürstendamm avenue between Bleibtreu and Schlüterstraße in Charlottenburg, Berlin. It was built in 1911, and has served as a hotel and as headquarters for several administrations. In 2011, the building was restored and converted to a commercial and residential building.

History
The building was named for marketing reasons as Cumberland, after Ernest Augustus, Crown Prince of Hanover, 3rd Duke of Cumberland and Teviotdale. The complex covers around  land area between Kurfürstendamm and Lietzenburger Straße 104–106. Many of the hotel suites were designed to be rented to domestic staff. This business idea later failed before the final opening of the building after the owner went into bankruptcy. The inventory and furniture were later auctioned off.

In 1914, the building temporarily housed the Waffen und Munitionsbeschaffungsamt (Arms and Ammunition Procurement Office (Wumba)). In the same year, it was converted to a Grand Hotel, rebuilt with 700 beds. After the First World War, the building housed the main post office building. From 1920, it housed the Ministry of Economics, theatres and cinemas. Since 1936, it housed various offices for tax authorities. From 1966 to 2003, the Berliner Oberfinanzdirektion (Berlin Regional Finance) offices were located in the building. Since then, the building has been empty, except for shops on the ground floor.

In 2004, the Haus Cumberland was renamed for a short period of time as the Cumberland Hotel Brecker for the film The Bourne Supremacy. In 2005, it was temporarily the film set for a ZDF television series. ORCO initially planned to build a luxury hotel and luxury shopping mall.

On 13 May 2011, there was a major fire in the attic of the building, and two construction workers and a fire-fighter were slightly injured. The fire also damaged the left side of the roof, causing that section to fall in. The dome of the first courtyard, which was made of galvanized steel, also collapsed. The fire was accidentally triggered during the renovation work. Eventually on September 14, 2013, the official handover of Haus Cumberland was celebrated. The housing complex for 500 residents includes 166 freehold apartments and 17 penthouses.

References

Buildings and structures in Berlin
Buildings and structures completed in 1911
1911 establishments in Germany